Robertsganj is a constituency of the Uttar Pradesh Legislative Assembly covering the city of Robertsganj in the Sonbhadra district of Uttar Pradesh, India.

Robertsganj is one of five assembly constituencies in the Robertsganj Lok Sabha constituency. Since 2008, this assembly constituency is numbered 401 amongst 403 constituencies.

Election results

2022

2017
Bharatiya Janta Party candidate Bhupesh Chaubey won in 2017 Uttar Pradesh Legislative Elections by defeating Samajwadi Party candidate Avinash Kushwaha by a margin of 40,538 votes.

References

External links
 

Assembly constituencies of Uttar Pradesh
Robertsganj